Giovannino is a 1976 Italian comedy film written and directed by Paolo Nuzzi and starring Christian De Sica, Tina Aumont, Jenny Tamburi and Carole André. It is based on a novel of the same name by Ercole Patti.

Plot

Cast 

Christian De Sica as Giovannino Calò
Tina Aumont as Nelly
Jenny Tamburi as Marcella
Carole André as  Anna
Delia Boccardo 
María Mercader as Giovannino's Mother
Saro Urzì as  Giovannino's Father
Piero Vida 
Giuliana Calandra  
Miguel Bosé

See also    
 List of Italian films of 1976

References

External links

Italian comedy films
1976 comedy films
1976 films
Films set in Sicily
Films scored by Franco Micalizzi
1970s Italian films
1970s Italian-language films